Assured Investment Management previously BlueMountain Capital Management and Assured Guaranty, is a diversified alternative asset manager founded in 2003 based in the United States'.

Company
BlueMountain was formed in 2003 with offices in New York and London. In 2016, the hedge fund managed US$22 billion. BlueMountain manages multiple alternative asset classes, including collateralized loan obligation, fixed income, healthcare private equity and other alternative investments.

The company made a reputation in part by making trades with JPMorgan Chase in the wake of the "London whale" trading loss in the bank's London branch.

In October of 2019, Assured Guaranty acquired BlueMountain Capital. In 2020, the firm was rebranded as Assured Investment Management.

Personnel
The chief executive officer and co-chief investment officer is Andrew Feldstein, who had a 10-year career at JP Morgan before co-founding the hedge fund. Harvard professor and former Federal Reserve Board member Jeremy C. Stein was hired in 2015 as a consultant to BlueMountain.

Investment
The firm has invested in Puerto Rican debt and has reportedly been active, including through DCI Group, in opposing efforts to give the commonwealth access to bankruptcy. After a debt relief program was passed by Congress in June 2016, a film company with reported ties to George Soros released two titles targeting BlueMountain, and specifically its holdings in Puerto Rico Electric Power Authority debt, among others for the impact of the financial crisis on health and education on the island.

References

External links
Company web site

Hedge fund firms of the United States
American companies established in 2003
Financial services companies established in 2003
Private equity firms of the United States